Ella Balinska (born 4 October 1996) is an English actress. She is known for starring in the action-comedy film Charlie's Angels (2019) and the Netflix original series Resident Evil (2022).

Early life and education
Balinska was born on 4 October 1996 in London to entrepreneur Kaz Balinski-Jundzill and chef Lorraine Pascale. She has described her background as being a mix of "British, Polish and Caribbean". Her parents divorced in 2000. Her father is married to model Sophie Anderton.

Balinska played county-level netball and competed in track and field at a national level, having been the javelin thrower for Team London. She went to James Allen's Girls' School in Dulwich and left in 2015 to attend Arts Educational School (ArtsEd) in Chiswick for Sixth Form. She then went on to train at the Guildford School of Acting. She left during her final semester in 2018 for work and returned in 2020 to complete her degree, officially graduating with a Bachelor of Arts in Acting in 2021. The Ella Balinska Scholarship was established in her name.

Career
In 2017, Balinska obtained the lead role in the Sky Kids series The Athena (2019) as Nyela Malik. She starred alongside Kristen Stewart and Naomi Scott in the action comedy Charlie's Angels, a continuation of the 1976 television series of the same name and two previous theatrical films. It was released in November 2019, garnering mixed critical reviews.

Balinska starred in the thriller film Run Sweetheart Run, which premiered at the 2020 Sundance Film Festival. She also starred in Resident Evil, a Netflix live-action television series based on the video game series of the same name. It was released in July 2022. Balinska portrayed and voiced Frey Holland, the protagonist of the action role-playing video game Forspoken. She is set to appear in The Occupant, a science fiction thriller film.

Personal life
Balinska is a supporter of the nonprofit organisation the British Fashion Council.

Filmography

Film

Television

Video games

Awards and nominations

References

External links

1996 births
21st-century English actresses
Living people
Actresses from London
Alumni of the Guildford School of Acting
Black British actresses
English actresses
English film actresses
English people of Polish descent
English people of West Indian descent
English television actresses
National Youth Theatre members
People educated at the Arts Educational Schools
People educated at James Allen's Girls' School